This is the complete list of Asian Games medalists in wrestling from 1954 to 2018.

Men's freestyle

Light flyweight
 48 kg: 1970–1994

Flyweight
 52 kg: 1954–1994
 54 kg: 1998

Bantamweight
 57 kg: 1954–1994
 58 kg: 1998
 55 kg: 2002–2010
 57 kg: 2014–

Featherweight
 62 kg: 1954–1958
 63 kg: 1962–1966
 62 kg: 1970–1994
 63 kg: 1998
 60 kg: 2002–2010
 61 kg: 2014

Lightweight
 67 kg: 1954–1958
 70 kg: 1962–1966
 68 kg: 1970–1994
 69 kg: 1998
 66 kg: 2002–2010
 65 kg: 2014–

Light welterweight
 70 kg: 2014

Welterweight
 73 kg: 1954–1958
 78 kg: 1962–1966
 74 kg: 1970–1994
 76 kg: 1998
 74 kg: 2002–

Middleweight
 79 kg: 1954–1958
 87 kg: 1962–1966
 82 kg: 1970–1994
 85 kg: 1998
 84 kg: 2002–2010
 86 kg: 2014–

Light heavyweight
 87 kg: 1958
 97 kg: 1962–1966
 90 kg: 1970–1994

Heavyweight 
 +87 kg: 1954–1958
 +97 kg: 1962–1966
 100 kg: 1970–1994
 97 kg: 1998
 96 kg: 2002–2010
 97 kg: 2014–

Super heavyweight
 +100 kg: 1970–1982
 130 kg: 1986–1998
 120 kg: 2002–2010
 125 kg: 2014–

Men's Greco-Roman

Light flyweight
 48 kg: 1974–1994

Flyweight
 52 kg: 1962–1994
 54 kg: 1998

Bantamweight
 57 kg: 1962–1994
 58 kg: 1998
 55 kg: 2002–2010
 59 kg: 2014
 60 kg: 2018–

Featherweight
 63 kg: 1962
 62 kg: 1974–1994
 63 kg: 1998
 60 kg: 2002–2010

Lightweight
 70 kg: 1962
 68 kg: 1974–1994
 69 kg: 1998
 66 kg: 2002–2014
 67 kg: 2018–

Light welterweight
 71 kg: 2014

Welterweight
 78 kg: 1962
 74 kg: 1974–1994
 76 kg: 1998
 74 kg: 2002–2010
 75 kg: 2014
 77 kg: 2018–

Light middleweight
 80 kg: 2014

Middleweight
 87 kg: 1962
 82 kg: 1974–1994
 85 kg: 1998
 84 kg: 2002–2010
 85 kg: 2014
 87 kg: 2018–

Light heavyweight
 97 kg: 1962
 90 kg: 1974–1994

Heavyweight
 +97 kg: 1962
 100 kg: 1974–1994
 97 kg: 1998
 96 kg: 2002–2010
 98 kg: 2014
 97 kg: 2018–

Super heavyweight
 +100 kg: 1974
 130 kg: 1986–1998
 120 kg: 2002–2010
 130 kg: 2014–

Women's freestyle

Flyweight
 48 kg: 2002–2014
 50 kg: 2018–

Bantamweight
 53 kg: 2018–

Lightweight
 55 kg: 2002–2014
 57 kg: 2018–

Middleweight
 63 kg: 2002–2014
 62 kg: 2018–

Light heavyweight
 68 kg: 2018–

Heavyweight
 72 kg: 2002–2010
 75 kg: 2014
 76 kg: 2018–

References
 UWW Database

Wrestling
medalists